Arthington is a civil parish in the metropolitan borough of the City of Leeds, West Yorkshire, England.  It contains 17 listed buildings that are recorded in the National Heritage List for England.  Of these, one is listed at Grade II*, the middle of the three grades, and the others are at Grade II, the lowest grade.  The parish contains the village of Arthington and is otherwise rural.  Most of the listed buildings are houses, cottages and associated structures, farmhouses and farm buildings.  The other listed buildings consist of a railway viaduct, a church, and a former wagon house.


Key

Buildings

References

Citations

Sources

 

Lists of listed buildings in West Yorkshire